Cry Alone may refer to:

"Cry Alone", song by Survivor's Jimi Jamison from When Love Comes Down
"Cry Alone", song by Bill Frisell from Big Sur (album) 2013
"Cry Alone", song by Lil Peep from Come Over When You're Sober, Pt. 2